Blossom Hill station is a Caltrain station located off Monterey Road near the Blossom Hill Road expressway in San Jose, California. The station is only served during weekday peak hours, with northbound trains in the morning and southbound trains in the evening.

Blossom Hill station has a single side platform serving one of the two tracks of the Union Pacific Railroad Coast Subdivision. 

A footbridge crosses the tracks at the station allowing pedestrians to access both Monterey Road and Great Oaks Parkway. The bridge, opened on September 28, 2012 was named Xander's Crossing, after two-year-old Alexander Arriaga who was killed crossing the tracks in the area in 2005.

References

External links

Caltrain - Blossom Hill

Caltrain stations in Santa Clara County, California
Railway stations in San Jose, California
Railway stations in the United States opened in 1992